In chemistry, perxenates are salts of the yellow xenon-containing anion . This anion has octahedral molecular geometry, as determined by Raman spectroscopy, having O–Xe–O bond angles varying between 87° and 93°. The Xe–O bond length was determined by X-ray crystallography to be 1.875 Å.

Synthesis 

Perxenates are synthesized by the disproportionation of xenon trioxide when dissolved in strong alkali:
2 XeO3 + 4 OH− → Xe +  + O2 + 2 H2O

When Ba(OH)2 is used as the alkali, barium perxenate can be crystallized from the resulting solution.

Perxenic acid

Perxenic acid is the unstable conjugate acid of the perxenate anion, formed by the solution of xenon tetroxide in water. It has not been isolated as a free acid, because under acidic conditions it rapidly decomposes into xenon trioxide and oxygen gas:

Its extrapolated formula, H4XeO6, is inferred from the octahedral geometry of the perxenate ion in its alkali metal salts.

The pKa of aqueous perxenic acid has been indirectly calculated to be below 0, making it an extremely strong acid. Its first ionization yields the anion , which has a pKa value of 4.29, still relatively acidic. The twice deprotonated species  has a pKa value of 10.81. Due to its rapid decomposition under acidic conditions as described above, however, it is most commonly known as perxenate salts, bearing the anion .

Properties

Perxenic acid and the anion  are both strong oxidizing agents, capable of oxidising silver(I) to silver(III), copper(II) to copper(III), and manganese(II) to permanganate.

The sodium, potassium, and barium salts are soluble. Barium perxenate solution is used as the starting material for the synthesis of xenon tetroxide (XeO4) by mixing it with concentrated sulfuric acid:
 Ba2XeO6 (s) + 2 H2SO4 (l) →  XeO4 (g) + 2 BaSO4 (s) + 2 H2O (l)

Most metal perxenates are stable, except silver perxenate, which decomposes violently.

Applications
Sodium perxenate, Na4XeO6, can be used for the analytic separation of trace amounts of americium from curium. The separation involves the oxidation of Am3+ to Am4+ by sodium perxenate in acidic solution in the presence of La3+, followed by treatment with calcium fluoride, which forms insoluble fluorides with Cm3+ and La3+, but retains Am4+ and Pu4+ in solution as soluble fluorides.

References

Oxyanions
Salts
Xenon(VIII) compounds
Octahedral compounds